Perai is a state constituency in Penang, Malaysia, that has been represented in the Penang State Legislative Assembly.

The state constituency was first contested in 2004 and is mandated to return a single Assemblyman to the Penang State Legislative Assembly under the first-past-the-post voting system. , the State Assemblyman for Perai is Ramasamy Palanisamy from the Democratic Action Party (DAP), which is part of the state's ruling coalition, Pakatan Harapan (PH).

Definition

Polling districts 
According to the federal gazette issued on 30 March 2018, the Perai constituency is divided into 6 polling districts.

Demographics

History

Election results
The electoral results for the Perai state constituency in 2008, 2013 and 2018 are as follows.

See also 
 Constituencies of Penang

References

Penang state constituencies